The Riley Creek Ranger Cabin No. 20, also known as Riley Creek Patrol Cabin, is a log shelter in the National Park Service Rustic style in Denali National Park.  The cabin is part of a network of shelters for patrolling park rangers throughout the park.  It is a standard design by the National Park Service Branch of Plans and Designs and was built in  1931.

References

Buildings and structures in Denali Borough, Alaska
Ranger stations in Denali National Park and Preserve
Park buildings and structures on the National Register of Historic Places in Alaska
Log cabins in the United States
Rustic architecture in Alaska
National Register of Historic Places in Denali National Park and Preserve
Log buildings and structures on the National Register of Historic Places in Alaska
1931 establishments in Alaska
Buildings and structures on the National Register of Historic Places in Denali Borough, Alaska